Hester College is one of the eight residential colleges of Murray State University. The college was established in the fall of 1996 when Murray State became the first public university in the United States to establish a campus-wide residential college system.
 
Hester College is named after Cleo G Hester who served as the university's registrar 1927–1960.

Hester Hall
Hester Hall is the home of Hester College.  

Hester Hall is an eight-story building with up to 24 double occupancy rooms on each floor. Each floor also has two community style bathrooms and at least one study lounge. The first floor consists of a main lobby, recreational back lobby, and a community kitchen. There are approximately 1,300 students assigned to Hester with about 300 students living within Hester Hall.

Floors
 Second Floor: "Hot Boys" Male 
 Third Floor: "The Gents" Male
 Fourth Floor: "Soldiers" Male
 Fifth Floor: "Foxes" Female
 Sixth Floor: "Suga Mamas" Female
 Seventh Floor: "Sweet Hearts" Female
 Eight Floor: "Golden Girls" Female

Traditions

Intramural sports
Hester fields several competitive intramural sports teams including softball, flag football, volleyball, basketball, water polo, ultimate frisbee, dodgeball, golf, and soccer. Hester has won the All Sports Cup for Residential Colleges 6 times (2000, 2002, 2003, 2004, 2005, and 2012)

Hedgehog Dinners
Once each month, students, faculty, and staff members of Hester College gather in Winslow Dining Hall. They eat dinner together as a group as a way to build community and enhance the family atmosphere of the college.

Staff

Residence Directors
Residence Directors perform a wide range of functions in providing leadership for the Residential College . Their main role is overseeing the housing operations of the college.
 Erin Chambers (January 2009 - May 2010)
 Josh Jones (August 2010 - May 2012)
 Evie Swanson (August 2012 - May 2014)
 Katie Coats (August 2014 – May 2016)
 Javonte Thompson (August 2016 – May 2018)
 Amelia Comper (August 2018 - May 2020)
 Jayden Willis (August 2020 - May 2022)
 Garrik Quertermous (August 2022 - Present)

College Heads
College Heads are tenured professors who spend half of their time in the Residential College and half teaching in their Academic Department. They each have an office in their Residential College and they are available to assist students. College Heads work with the Residence Directors, RAs and Residential College Council to provide overall leadership and direction for the Residential Colleges. 
 Dr. Ron Cella (Fall 1996 - Spring 2004)
 Dr. Gina Clawell (Fall 2004 - Spring 2006)
 Dr. Eric Umstead (Fall 2006 - Spring 2009)
 Mr. Kenny Fister (Fall 2009–Present)

Resident Advisors
Resident Advisors (RAs) live with the residents on each floor. They are student staff members selected on the basis of their skills, interests, and activities that enable them to assist and advise students in obtaining the most from their experience at Murray State University . Each Resident Advisor is trained in student referrals with academic and personal concerns. This is the most important staff member for your son or daughter to get to know.

Residential College Council
The Hester Residential College Council (RCC) is a self-governing body made up of residents, staff and commuters. The Council hosts events in the college and promotes and participates in events hosted by the university. Some of these events are intramural sports, cook-outs, and other social events. The meetings are open to all residents and members of Hester College.

Presidents 
 Rachel Just (Fall 2007 - Spring 2009)
 Mitchell Ostrout (Fall 2009 - Spring 2010)
 Hannah Robbins (Fall 2010 - Spring 2011)
 Brandon Bush (Fall 2011 - Spring 2012)
 Chet Adams (Fall 2012 - Spring 2014 )
 Travis Plunkett (Fall 2014 – Spring 2016)
 Reilly Schaefer (Fall 2016 – Fall 2018)
 Jacob Bandura (Spring 2019 – Spring 2020)
 Grace Murray (Fall 2020 - Spring 2021)
 Rebecca Ghrigsby (Fall 2021 - Present)

References

University and college dormitories in the United States
Murray State University
Educational institutions established in 1996
1996 establishments in Kentucky